Brazeau Reservoir is a large man made reservoir in Alberta, Canada.

It was developed along the Brazeau River, at the confluence with Elk River, in the hydrographic basin of the North Saskatchewan River.

Energy production
The dam and hydroelectric plant are managed by TransAlta. The plant has an electricity generating capacity of 355 megawatts (MW). The Brazeau Plant is the largest hydroelectric plant owned by TransAlta.

The hydrology of the Brazeau area allows it to produce an annual average of 397,000 megawatt hours (MW⋅h) of electric energy. The annual output of the Brazeau Plant is slightly behind TransAlta's Bighorn Dam, with a smaller peak capacity of 120 MW but an available water supply that allows it to produce 408,000 MW⋅h each year.

Recreation
The Brazeau Reservoir Provincial Recreation Area is established near the lake, upstream from the dam and another three campgrounds dot its shores

See also
List of lakes in Alberta

References

Brazeau County
Brazeau
Reservoirs in Alberta
Pumped-storage hydroelectric power stations